This is a list of tofu dishes. Tofu, also called bean curd, is a food made by coagulating soy milk and then pressing the resulting curds into soft white blocks. It is a component in many East Asian and Southeast Asian cuisines.

Tofu dishes

 
 
 
 
 
 
 
 Dubu gui – grilled tofu rectangles
 Dubu jjigae – Korean tofu stew
 
 
 
 
 
 
 
 
 
 
 
 
 
 Tahu aci
 
 
 
 Tahu gimbal
 
 Tahu petis

Condiments

See also

 Aburaage
 Burmese tofu
 Dubu
 List of soy-based foods
 Soy pulp
 Soybean
 Tofu skin

References

Bibliography
 Du Bois, Christine M.; Tan, Chee-Beng. Mintz, Sidney Wilfred (2008), The World of Soy, University of Illinois Press, 
 Knopper, Melissa. (Jan 2002), The joy of soy, The Rotarian, Vol. 180, No. 1, p. 16, ISSN 0035-838X

External links
 

 
Tofu